North White School Corporation is a public school district located in White County, Indiana.

Schools in North White School Corporation 

Schools in the North White School Corporation:
 North White Elementary School Grades K-5
 North White Middle High School   Grades 6–12

Admin of North White Schools
Mrs. McIntire is the Principal of North White Elementary School
Mr. VanDerAa is the Principal of North White Middle High School
Ms. Holst is the Assistant Principal of North White Middle High School
Mr. Woodcock is the Athletic Director of North White School Corporation

School Addresses
North White Elementary School
304 E Broadway
Monon, Indiana 47959

North White Middle High School
305 E Broadway
Monon, Indiana 47959

References

External links

School districts in Indiana
Education in White County, Indiana